Miss Malaysia World 2013, the 47th edition of Miss World Malaysia was held at the Corus Hotel, Kuala Lumpur on August 1, 2014. Yvonne Lee of Selangor crowned her successor, Melinder Bhullar from Kuala Lumpur at the end of the event.

Fifteen contestants from different states competed for the crown. Melinder then represented Malaysia at the Miss World 2013 held in Bali, Indonesia where she placed as fourth runner-up for Multimedia Award.

Results

Special awards

Contestants 
15 contestants competed for the crown and title.

Disqualified 
Four Muslim contestants were disqualified from the pageant due to the fatwa which prohibit Muslim women from competing in beauty pageants.
 Wafa Johanna de Korte, Kuala Lumpur
 Sara Amellia Bernard, Perak
 Miera Sheikh, Melaka
 Kathrina Redzuan, Kuala Lumpur

Retreats 

 Sherine Tan, Kuala Lumpur

References

External links

 

Beauty pageants in Malaysia
2013 beauty pageants
2013